Barbecue Township is one of thirteen townships in Harnett County, North Carolina, United States. In the 2010 census, it had a population of 17,033 in 6,330 households. It is a part of the Dunn Micropolitan Area, which is also a part of the greater Raleigh–Durham–Cary Combined Statistical Area (CSA) as defined by the United States Census Bureau.

Geographically, Barbecue Township occupies  in southwestern Harnett County. There are no incorporated municipalities located in Barbecue Township, however, there are several unincorporated communities located here, including the communities of Barbecue, Olivia and Pineview.

References

Townships in Harnett County, North Carolina
Townships in North Carolina